The Rural Municipality of Old Post No. 43 is a rural municipality (RM) in the Canadian province of Saskatchewan within Census Division No. 3 and  Division No. 2. It is located in the southern portion of the province adjacent to the United States border, neighbouring Valley County and Daniels County in Montana.

History 
The RM of Old Post No. 43 incorporated as a rural municipality on January 1, 1967.

Heritage properties
There is one heritage building located within the RM.
Elm Springs Roumanian Orthodox Church - Constructed in 1926, the church is in the Elma Springs area.  Originally constructed by Roumanian immigrants and originally called the Ascension of Our Lord Church it played an important role in the community.  Today it is only used for a few services per year.

Geography

Communities and localities 
The following urban municipalities are surrounded by the RM.

Villages
 Wood Mountain

The following unincorporated communities are within the RM.

Localities
 Canopus
 Elm Springs
 Killdeer
 Lonesome Butte
 Macworth
 Quantock
 Strathallen
 West Poplar
 Willowvale

Demographics 

Attractions 
 Wood Mountain Community Pool
 Wood Mountain Regional Park
 Wood Mountain Rodeo & Ranching Museum (located at the regional park)
 Wood Mountain Post Historic Park

Events
 Wood Mountain Stampede, located at Wood Mountain Regional Park, is oldest continuous annual rodeo in Canada. It has run since 1890.
 Wood Mountain Farmers Market
 Wood Mountain Trade Fair

Government 
The RM of Old Post No. 43 is governed by an elected municipal council and an appointed administrator that meets on the second Thursday of every month. The reeve position is vacant while the RM's administrator is Vickie Greffard. The RM's office is located in Wood Mountain.

Transportation 
The RM is a part owner of the Fife Lake Railway.

See also 
List of rural municipalities in Saskatchewan

References 

O
Division No. 3, Saskatchewan